Saint Margaret of Antioch is a painting of 1631 by Francisco de Zurbarán in the National Gallery, London, which bought it in 1903.

The artist shows the saint Margaret of Antioch as a shepherdess, holding a crook (referring to the legend that she grazed her nurse's sheep). Behind her is the dragon from whose stomach she burst. The eyes and facial features of the model are identified by some art historians with the model for the same artist's Saint Agatha.

References

1631 paintings
Zurbaran
Collections of the National Gallery, London
Paintings by Francisco de Zurbarán
Paintings of dragons
Books in art